The 2010 Pan American Fencing Championships were held in San José, Costa Rica from 2 to 7 July.

Medal summary

Men's events

Women's events

Medal table

References

2010
Pan American Fencing Championships
International sports competitions hosted by Costa Rica
Fencing competitions in Costa Rica
2010 in Costa Rican sport